Beamsley is a village and civil parish in the Craven district of North Yorkshire, England.  It is just within the boundary of the Yorkshire Dales National Park, and about six miles east of Skipton and two miles north of Addingham.  The village lies immediately south of the A59 road and on the eastern bank of the River Wharfe.

According to the 2001 census, the parish had a population of 149, reducing to 139 at the 2011 Census. The parish is bordered by West Yorkshire to the south.

The former Beamsley Methodist Church has been carefully modified, by the Beamsley Project Charitable Trust, to become a self-catering holiday centre for people with disabilities. The quiet roads around Beamsley make it a popular destination with cyclists with the Tour de France Grand Depart 2014 passing through the local area close to Beamsley.

On the other side of the A59 to Beamsley village is the site of Beamsley Hospital. This building was noted for its odd design of seven rooms radiating out from a central area. This meant that to go to a room you had to pass through a chapel which was an encouragement to prayer. The Hospital is now managed by the Landmark Trust as self-catering accommodation.

The Beacon is notable for its stone cairns, one of which is supposedly there to mark the burial site of a chieftain from the Bronze Age. Stones on the beacon were also used to construct a guard hut during the Napoleonic Wars.

JMW Turner painted a shooting party on Beamsley Beacon in 1816.

In 2015, a memorial was unveiled to the Royal Canadian Air Force aircrew who died when their Lancaster Bomber crashed into the beacon. Four of the crew died and four survived. The bomber was flying out of RAF Leeming in North Yorkshire when it crashed in fog around midday on 5 November 1945.

Although small, Base 3 Systems, an analytics consultancy and N.Peal, a luxury cashmere designer, have head offices in the village.

Notable residents
Christopher Clapham (1608–1686), MP

References

External links

Villages in North Yorkshire
Civil parishes in North Yorkshire
Wharfedale
Craven District